In military terms, 137th Division or 137th Infantry Division may refer to:

 137th Infantry Division (Wehrmacht)
 137th Division (Imperial Japanese Army)